The list of shipwrecks in the Channel Islands lists some of the ships that wrecked on or sank in the waters of the Bailiwick of Guernsey and the Bailiwick of Jersey. The list includes ships that sustained a damaged hull, which were later refloated and repaired.

There are at least 700 identified shipwrecks and another 100 unidentified, in Bailiwick of Guernsey waters alone.

Jersey experiences some of the largest tidal ranges in the world, up to 12 metres; Guernsey has slightly less dramatic tides. The mass of water moving in and out gives rise to fast moving currents. Alderney has the Alderney Race, which can run up to about twelve knots during equinoctial tides.

The Bailiwick of Guernsey comprises the islands of Guernsey, Alderney, Sark, Herm and a number of smaller islands, islets and rocks. See List of islands of the Bailiwick of Guernsey for a complete list of their smaller islands.

Les Casquets or (The) Casquets; is a group of rocks 13 km west of Alderney and are part of an underwater sandstone ridge. Other parts which emerge above the water are the islets of Burhou and Ortac. Little vegetation grows on them.

The Bailiwick of Jersey comprises the island of Jersey and a number of smaller islets and rocks, most of which are covered at high tide. See List of islands of the Bailiwick of Jersey for a complete list of their smaller islands.

Les Minquiers  S of Jersey, its largest island is only 50 metres by 20 metres, but at low water, Les Minquiers has a land area greater than 100km².

The deliberate wrecking of ships has not been a Channel Island trait, although the recovery of goods from a natural wreck has always been undertaken. Smuggling and Privateer's have abounded in the Islands' waters over many centuries.

Modern navigation systems have helped reduce the number of disasters, but shipping still receive warnings of waters around the Channel Islands.

Key

12th to 19th centuries

20th and 21st centuries

See also

 Bailiwick of Guernsey
 Transport in Guernsey
 Bailiwick of Jersey
 Transport in Jersey

References 

Channel Islands
Transport disasters in the Channel Islands
Channel Islands-related lists
History of Alderney
History of Guernsey
History of Jersey
Maritime incidents